U-123 may refer to one of the following German submarines:

 , a Type UE II submarine launched in 1918 and that served in World War I until surrendered on 22 November 1918; sunk on east coast of England on way to be broken up in 1921
 During World War I, Germany also had this submarine with a similar name:
 , a Type UB III submarine launched in 1918 and probably sunk by a mine on 19 October 1918

Submarines of Germany